This article lists important figures and events in Malaysian public affairs during the year 1988, together with births and deaths of notable Malaysians.

Incumbent political figures

Federal level
Yang di-Pertuan Agong: Sultan Iskandar
Raja Permaisuri Agong: Sultanah Zanariah
Prime Minister: Dato' Sri Dr Mahathir Mohamad
Deputy Prime Minister: Dato' Ghafar Baba
Lord President: Mohamed Salleh Abas then Abdul Hamid Omar

State level
 Sultan of Johor: Tunku Ibrahim Ismail (Regent)
 Sultan of Kedah: Sultan Abdul Halim Muadzam Shah 
 Sultan of Kelantan: Sultan Ismail Petra
 Raja of Perlis: Tuanku Syed Putra
 Sultan of Perak:Sultan Azlan Shah (Deputy Yang di-Pertuan Agong)
 Sultan of Pahang: Sultan Ahmad Shah
 Sultan of Selangor: Sultan Salahuddin Abdul Aziz Shah
 Sultan of Terengganu: Sultan Mahmud Al-Muktafi Billah Shah
 Yang di-Pertuan Besar of Negeri Sembilan: Tuanku Jaafar
 Yang di-Pertua Negeri (Governor) of Penang: Tun Dr Awang Hassan
 Yang di-Pertua Negeri (Governor) of Malacca: Tun Syed Ahmad Al-Haj bin Syed Mahmud Shahabuddin
 Yang di-Pertua Negeri (Governor) of Sarawak: Tun Ahmad Zaidi Adruce Mohammed Noor
 Yang di-Pertua Negeri (Governor) of Sabah: Tun Said Keruak

Events
4 February – UMNO was declared an illegal organisation by the High Court.
14 February – UMNO Baru was formed.
22 February – The longest hanging dragon in Malaysia was hung at The Mall, Kuala Lumpur during Chinese New Year to mark the Year of the Dragon. 
1 March – Ipoh was granted city status.
11 March – The Sultan Salahuddin Abdul Aziz Mosque in Shah Alam, Selangor was fully constructed. This is the largest mosque in Malaysia. 
13 May – The Highway Concessionnaires Berhad changed its name to Projek Lebuhraya Utara-Selatan (PLUS).
4 July – The Malaysian constitutional crisis ended.
July – Opening of the Sultan Ismail Power Station in Paka, Terengganu, the largest power station in Malaysia.
31 July – Sultan Abdul Halim ferry terminal bridge collapse in Butterworth, Penang killed 32 and injured 1,674 people.
1 August – Kuching was granted city status. It comprises Kuching North and Kuching South.
29 August – The biggest Malaysian flag was hung in Angkasapuri and is the largest flag in this country ever hung to date.
16 September – Sarawak celebrated its 25th anniversary of independence within Malaysia.
21 November – Air France's supersonic Concorde made its first landing at Subang International Airport.
18 December – Footballer R Arumugam died in a car accident on Federal Highway near Petaling Jaya, Selangor.

Births
5 January — Azizulhasni Awang — Track Cyclist
9 January – Anzalna Nasir – Actress
28 March – Liyana Jasmay – Actress
23 April – Hairul Azreen – Actor
13 June – Shukri Yahaya – Actor
30 June – Alif Hadi – Actor and host
30 July – Wen Chean Lim – rhythmic gymnast
15 August – Hazman Al-Idrus – Singer
25 October – Tiz Zaqyah – Actress
17 November – Durratun Nashihin Rosli – rhythmic gymnast
15 December – Idris Khan – Actor

Deaths
17 March – Tun Tan Siew Sin – Minister of Commerce and Industry, Minister of Finance and MCA president
29 June – Tengku Ampuan Afzan of Pahang and 7th Raja Permaisuri Agong
22 August – Tun Henry H S Lee – First Finance Minister
18 December – R Arumugam – Footballer

See also
 1988 
 1987 in Malaysia | 1989 in Malaysia
 History of Malaysia

References

 
Years of the 20th century in Malaysia
Malaysia
Malaysia
1980s in Malaysia